Brian Carter (17 November 1938–21 July 2019) was an English professional footballer who played as a midfielder in the English Football League for Portsmouth and Bristol Rovers in the 1950s and 1960s.

Early life
Carter was born in Dorset, England, the son of Edward Carter and Eileen Bird. He attended Weymouth Grammar School and began his footballing career with Weymouth as a sixteen-year-old, signing professional terms with them when he turned 17.

Footballing career
In January 1956, two months after his seventeenth birthday, he was signed by Portsmouth for a transfer fee of £2,500. He went on to make 44 league appearances in a five-year spell with the Fratton Park club. He moved to Bristol Rovers in June 1961 for a fee of £1,500 but left after nine months having made just four first team appearances.

From Bristol Rovers he joined Bath City in March 1962, where he appeared in 242 league matches, scoring seven goals. After this he played for a number of non-league clubs around the west of England, mostly in Somerset.

References

1938 births
2019 deaths
Sportspeople from Dorchester, Dorset
Footballers from Dorset
English footballers
Association football midfielders
Weymouth F.C. players
Portsmouth F.C. players
Bristol Rovers F.C. players
Bath City F.C. players
Bridgwater Town F.C. players
Welton Rovers F.C. players
Welton Rovers F.C. managers
Shepton Mallet F.C. players
Melksham Town F.C. players
Clandown F.C. players
English football managers